The 2017 Keio Challenger was a professional tennis tournament played on hard courts. It was the twelfth (ATP) and first (ITF) editions of the tournament and part of the 2017 ATP Challenger Tour and the 2017 ITF Women's Circuit. The tournament offered $50,000+H in prize money for the men and $25,000 prize money for the women. It took place in Yokohama, Japan between 27 February and 5 March 2017 for the men's edition and between 6 and 12 March 2017 for the women's.

Men's singles main-draw entrants

Seeds

 1 Rankings are as of February 20, 2017.

Other entrants
The following players received wildcards into the singles main draw:
  Sora Fukuda
  Masato Shiga
  Kaito Uesugi
  Yosuke Watanuki

The following player received entry into the singles main using a protected ranking:
  Cedrik-Marcel Stebe

The following player received entry into the singles main draw as a special exemption:
  Lloyd Harris

The following players received entry from the qualifying draw:
  Brydan Klein
  Kwon Soon-woo
  Blake Mott
  Takuto Niki

Women's singles main-draw entrants

Seeds

 1 Rankings are as of February 27, 2017.

Other entrants
The following players received wildcards into the singles main draw:
  Sumina Eshiro
  Hayaka Murase
  Megumi Nishimoto
  Suzuho Oshino

The following players received entry from the qualifying draw:
  Haruna Arakawa
  Erina Hayashi
  Miyabi Inoue
  Haruka Kaji
  Rio Kitagawa
  Mai Minokoshi
  Ramu Ueda
  Aki Yamasoto

Champions

Men's singles

 Yūichi Sugita def.  Kwon Soon-woo 6–4, 2–6, 7–6(7–2).

Women's singles
 Akiko Omae def.  Mayo Hibi 7–5, 6–2.

Men's doubles

 Marin Draganja /  Tomislav Draganja def.  Joris De Loore /  Luke Saville 4–6, 6–3, [10–4].

Women's doubles
 Ayaka Okuno /  Erika Sema def.  Kanako Morisaki /  Minori Yonehara, 6–4, 6–4.

External links
Official Website
2017 Keio Challenger at ITFtennis.com

 
Keio Challenger
2017 in Japanese tennis
Keio Challenger
Keio Challenger
February 2017 sports events in Japan
March 2017 sports events in Japan